The MAS1 oncogene (MAS receptor) is a G protein-coupled receptor which binds the angiotensin II metabolite angiotensin (1-7). The MAS1 receptor, when activated by binding angiotensin-(1-7), opposes many of the effects of the angiotensin II receptor. Hence, MAS1 receptor agonists have similar therapeutic effects to angiotensin II receptor antagonists, including lowering of blood pressure.

References

External links 
 IUPHAR GPCR Database - MAS1
 IUPHAR GPCR Database - MAS1L